Llévame contigo is a 1951 Argentine film directed by Juan Sires.

Plot
In an abandoned mansion, two homeless squatters witness a woman who hits her husband and leaves him for dead.

Cast
 Jorge Salcedo
 Aída Alberti
 Enrique García Satur
 Guillermo Pedemonte
 Joaquín Franco
 Manuel Alcón

References

External links
 

1951 films
1950s Spanish-language films
Argentine black-and-white films
Squatting in film
1950s Argentine films